Maplewood Park is an unincorporated community and census-designated place in southern Hubbard Township, Trumbull County, Ohio, United States. The population was 243 at the 2020 census. It is part of the Youngstown–Warren metropolitan area.

Geography
Maplewood Park is located at  (41.136697, -80.581985).

Demographics

As of the census of 2000, there were 321 people, 123 households, and 91 families residing in the CDP. The population density was 427.9 people per square mile (165.3/km2). There were 132 housing units at an average density of 176.0/sq mi (68.0/km2). The racial makeup of the CDP was 40.50% White, 58.26% African American, 0.31% Native American, and 0.93% from two or more races.

There were 123 households, out of which 26.8% had children under the age of 18 living with them, 49.6% were married couples living together, 18.7% had a female householder with no husband present, and 26.0% were non-families. 23.6% of all households were made up of individuals, and 10.6% had someone living alone who was 65 years of age or older. The average household size was 2.61 and the average family size was 3.09.

In the CDP the population was spread out, with 23.7% under the age of 18, 6.5% from 18 to 24, 26.2% from 25 to 44, 23.1% from 45 to 64, and 20.6% who were 65 years of age or older. The median age was 41 years. For every 100 females there were 99.4 males. For every 100 females age 18 and over, there were 88.5 males.

The median income for a household in the CDP was $24,318, and the median income for a family was $30,795. Males had a median income of $16,458 versus $13,929 for females. The per capita income for the CDP was $12,904. About 14.6% of families and 19.1% of the population were below the poverty line, including 68.2% of those under age 18 and 16.7% of those age 65 or over.

References

Census-designated places in Trumbull County, Ohio